Mohammed Jassim (born 26 November 1996) is an Indian professional footballer who plays as a defender for I-League club Gokulam Kerala.
A versatile player who mainly plays as a center back, Jassim can also be deployed as a left back.

Club career
Born in Malappuram, Kerala, Jassim began his career with the Malabar Special Police Academy after impressing for the Kerala youth teams. He would soon move to Goa and join Goa Professional League club Vasco.

Gokulam Kerala
Prior to the 2020–21 season, Jassim joined I-League club Gokulam Kerala. He made his professional debut for the club on 25 January 2021 against NEROCA, coming on as a last-minute substitute in a 4–1 victory.

Career statistics

Club

Honours

Gokulam Kerala
 I-League: 2020–21

References

External links
 Mohammed Jassim at the AIFF

1996 births
Living people
Indian footballers
Association football defenders
Vasco SC players
Gokulam Kerala FC players
I-League players
Footballers from Kerala
People from Malappuram